Goniosema anguliscripta is a moth of the subfamily Arctiinae. It was described by Thomas Pennington Lucas in 1890. It is found in Australia, where it has been recorded from New South Wales and Queensland.

References

Lithosiini
Moths described in 1890